The 2014–15 season was PFC CSKA Sofia's 67th consecutive season in A Group. This article shows player statistics and all matches (official and friendly) that the club will play during the 2014–15 season.

Players

Squad stats 

|-
|colspan="14"|Players sold or loaned out after the start of the season:

|}
As of 31 May 2015

Top Scorers

As of 31 May 2015

Disciplinary Record

As of 31 May 2015

Players in/out

Summer transfers 

In:

Out:

Winter transfers 

In:

Out:

Pre-season and friendlies

Competitions

A Group

First phase

Table

Results summary

Results by round

Fixtures and results

Championship round

Table

Results summary

Results by round

Fixtures and results

Bulgarian Cup 

CSKA is eliminated from the competition.

Europa League 

By ending as runner-up from A Grupa 2013/14, CSKA Sofia qualified for the Europa League. They started in the second qualifying round.

1–1 on aggregate. Zimbru won on away goals. CSKA is eliminated.

See also 
PFC CSKA Sofia

References

External links 
CSKA Official Site
CSKA Fan Page with up-to-date information
Bulgarian A Professional Football Group
UEFA Profile

PFC CSKA Sofia seasons
Cska Sofia